K with stroke and diagonal stroke (Ꝅ, ꝅ) is a letter of the Latin alphabet, derived from K with the addition of bars through the ascender and the leg.

Usage 
This letter is used in medieval texts as an abbreviation for karta and kartam, a document or writ.  It was also used as an abbreviation for Kalendas at the end of the tenth century.  The same function could also be performed by "K with stroke" (Ꝁ, ꝁ), or "K with diagonal stroke" (Ꝃ, ꝃ).

Computer encodings
Capital and small K with stroke and diagonal stroke is encoded in Unicode as of version 5.1, at codepoints U+A744 and U+A745.

References

Bibliography 
 Adriano Cappelli, Lexicon Abbreviaturarum, J. J. Weber, Leipzig (1928).

Phonetic transcription symbols
Latin letters with diacritics